

Qualifying criteria 
An NOC may enter up to 3 athletes per weapon (épée, foil, or sabre) if it has qualified for the team event and 1 athlete per if it has not.

The top seven teams at the 2010 Pan American Championship plus hosts Mexico qualified a team for each respective team event, and two athletes for the individual event for that weapon. Also this championship qualified the top 2 athletes per event for the individual event if the country had not qualified through the team event.

Participating nations

Men's Épée
Team

Individual

Men's Foil
Team

Individual

Men's Sabre
Team

Individual

Women's Épée
Team

Individual

Women's Foil
Team

Individual

Women's Sabre
Team

Individual

Canada has withdrawn from the women's sabre team event, with Panama replacing the country in the event after finishing in ninth place at the 2010 Pan American Championship.

See also
Fencing at the 2011 Pan American Games

References

P
Qualification for the 2011 Pan American Games
Fencing at the 2011 Pan American Games